David Dodd (born 1 February 1985 in Southport, Queensland, Australia) is an Australian footballer who plays for Edgeworth Eagles in the NBN State Football League. He had previously played for Brisbane Roar. His brother Karl Dodd has also played in the A-League for various clubs including Brisbane Roar and Wellington Phoenix.

A-League statistics

1 – includes A-League final series statistics
2 – includes FIFA Club World Cup statistics; AFC Champions League statistics are included in season commencing after group stages (i.e. ACL and A-League seasons etc.)

References

1985 births
Living people
Sportspeople from the Gold Coast, Queensland
Soccer players from Queensland
Australian soccer players
A-League Men players
Lancaster City F.C. players
Brisbane Roar FC players
Association football midfielders